UASD may refer to:

 Universidad Autónoma de Santo Domingo
 University of Agricultural Sciences, Dharwad